Narcissism in the workplace involves the impact of narcissistic employees and managers in workplace settings.

Job interviews

Narcissists typically perform well at job interviews; they receive more favorable hiring ratings from interviewers than individuals who are not narcissists. Typically, because they can make favorable first impressions, though that may not translate to better job performance once hired.

Impact on workplace satisfaction

Impact on stress, absenteeism and staff turnover 
There tends to be a higher level of stress with people who work with or interact with a narcissist. While there are a variety of reasons for this to be the case, an important one is the relationship between narcissism and aggression. Aggression is believed to moderate the relationship between narcissism and counterproductive work behaviors. Penney and Spector found narcissism to be positively related to counterproductive workplace behaviors, such as interpersonal aggression, sabotaging the work of others, finding excuses to waste other peoples' time and resources, and spreading rumors. These aggressive acts can raise the stress of other employees, which in turn increases absenteeism and staff turnover. No correlation was found between employees under the directions of a narcissist leader and absenteeism. However, employees under the direction of a non-narcissist leader show a decline on absenteeism over time.

Workplace bullying 

In 2007, researchers Catherine Mattice and Brian Spitzberg at San Diego State University, USA, found that narcissism revealed a positive relationship with bullying.  Narcissists were found to prefer indirect bullying tactics (such as withholding information that affects others' performance, ignoring others, spreading gossip, constantly reminding others of mistakes, ordering others to do work below their competence level, and excessively monitoring others' work) rather than direct tactics (such as making threats, shouting, persistently criticizing, or making false allegations). This is significant in the workplace because narcissists are likely to be more emotionally volatile and aggressive than other employees, which could become a risk for all employees.

The research also revealed that narcissists are highly motivated to bully, and that to some extent, they are left with feelings of satisfaction after a bullying incident occurs. Despite the fact that many narcissist will avoid work, they can be eager to steal the work of others. In line with other dark triad traits, many narcissists will manipulate others and their environment so that they can claim responsibility for company accomplishments that they had little or nothing to do with. A study was done in 2017, that looked at dark traits within those who hold leadership positions and that effect on employee depression. The research done supported the idea that employees mental health and stability was negatively affected by bullying (some narcissistic behavior) in the workplace.

Organizational Design Preferences 
Narcissists like hierarchical organizations because they think they will rise to high ranks and reap status and power. They take special interest in acquiring leadership positions and may be better at procuring them. Narcissists are less interested in hierarchies where there is little opportunity for upward mobility. The prototypical narcissist is more concerned with getting praised and how they are perceived than doing what benefits all of the "stakeholders". Some narcissistic attributes may confer benefits, but the negative and positive outcomes of narcissistic leadership are not yet fully understood. In terms of the internal functioning of organizations, narcissists can be especially damaging, or ill-fit, to jobs that require judicious self assessment, heavily rely on teams, and/or use 360 degree feedback.

Corporate narcissism 

According to Alan Downs, corporate narcissism occurs when a narcissist becomes the chief executive officer (CEO) (or another leadership role) within the senior management team and gathers an adequate mix of codependents around him or her to support the narcissistic behavior. Narcissists profess company loyalty but are only really committed to their own agendas; thus, organizational decisions are founded on the narcissist's own interests rather than the interests of the organization as a whole, the various stakeholders, or the society in which the organization operates. As a result, a certain kind of charismatic leader can run a financially successful company on thoroughly unhealthy principles (at least for a time).

Neville Symington has suggested that one of the ways of differentiating a good-enough organisation from one that is pathological is through its ability to exclude narcissistic characters from key posts.

Narcissistic supply

The narcissistic manager will have two main sources of narcissistic supply: inanimate (status symbols like cars, gadgets or office views); and animate (flattery and attention from colleagues and subordinates). Teammates may find everyday offers of support swiftly turn them into enabling sources of permanent supply, unless they are very careful to maintain proper boundaries. The narcissistic manager's need to protect such supply networks will prevent objective decision-making. Such a manager will evaluate long-term strategies according to their potential for gaining personal attention instead of to benefit the organization.

Productive narcissists
Crompton has distinguished what he calls productive narcissists from unproductive narcissists. Maccoby acknowledged that productive narcissists still tend to be over-sensitive to criticism, over-competitive, isolated, and grandiose, but considered that what draws them out is that they have a sense of freedom to do whatever they want rather than feeling constantly constrained by circumstances, and that through their charisma they are able to draw people into their vision, and produce a cohort of disciples who will pursue the dream for all it's worth. Studies show that narcissists tend to be more proactive in their work in an attempt to achieve a higher, more prestigious status.

Others have questioned the concept, considering that the dramatic collapse of Wall Street and the financial system in 2009 must give us pause. Is the collapse due to business leaders who have developed narcissistic styles—even if ostensibly productive? Certainly one may conclude that at best there can be quite a fine line between narcissists who perform badly in the workplace because of their traits, and those who achieve outrageous success because of them.

See also

References

Further reading
 Gerald Falkowski, Jean Ritala Narcissism in the Workplace (2007) 
 Samuel Grier Narcissism in the Workplace: What It Is - How To Spot It - What To Do About It (2011)
 Belinda McDaniel The Narcissists in Your Life: Coping with and Surviving Narcissists in the Workplace, at Home and Wherever You Are Forced to Associate with People Suffering from Narcissistic Personality Disorder (2014)
 Sam Vaknin, Lidija Rangelovska The Narcissist and the Psychopath in the Workplace (2006)

External links
 Anna Verasai Dealing With Different Types of Narcissists at Work The HR Digest 28 Jul 2016
 Tomas Chamorro-Premuzic Why We Keep Hiring Narcissistic CEOs Harvard Business Review 29 Nov 2016

Human resource management
Narcissism
Positions of authority
Workplace
Workplace bullying
Employment
Emotional issues